The Lumberjack Band was a marching band that played at Green Bay Packers' games. The band earned its name because of the plaid flannel jackets its members originally wore.

Formed in 1921, the Lumberjack Band was originally made up of volunteers. Throughout the 1920s and 1930s, the band accompanied groups of fans to road games, especially to those with the Chicago Bears.

In 1931, the band first played "Go! You Packers! Go!", the official fight song of the Green Bay Packers.

The Lumberjack Band was a fixture at Packer games, and an integral part of the City Stadium experience. Curly Lambeau, founder, player, and first coach of the Packers, was convinced that the band played a role in many Packer victories. A bandstand was built for the Lumberjack Band at one corner of the field, and early designs for New City Stadium, later renamed Lambeau Field, showed separate stands with a bandstand in one corner, before the decision was made to have a bowl-shaped stadium.

When Vince Lombardi became head coach and general manager, he upgraded the band's look, saying the traditional flannels did not fit with the team's new stadium. The band was renamed simply "The Green Bay Packer Band" and was set up in the southwest corner of the field, occasionally seeing "guest appearances" by players running out of bounds. The uniforms changed to green military-style outfits. At the time of Lambeau's death in 1965, he was dating Mary Jane Sorgel, a majorette for the Green Bay Packer Band. Wilner Burke directed the band during this period, giving way to Lovell Ives in 1982.

In the 1990s, the use of recorded music and the airing of advertisements on video screens led to the band's playing time being cut back. By 1997, the band was disbanded and re-formed as three six-piece bands called the "Green Bay Packers Tailgaters", which roam the Lambeau Field parking lot before games, playing songs by request for tailgating fans. Kevin Van Ess is the current lead contact for the Green Bay Packer Tailgater Bands.

References

External links
Green Bay Packers official web site

Sports in Green Bay, Wisconsin
History of the Green Bay Packers
1921 establishments in Wisconsin
Musical groups from Wisconsin
Musical groups established in 1921